Timema bartmani, or Bartman's timema, is a species of stick insect in the family Timematidae. It is found in North America.

References

Further reading

 
 
 

Phasmatodea
Articles created by Qbugbot
Insects described in 1997